The 253rd (University Highland) Battalion, CEF, was a unit in the Canadian Expeditionary Force during the First World War.  Based in Kingston, Ontario, the unit began recruiting in mid-autumn of 1916, primarily among university students from throughout Canada.  After sailing to England in May 1917, the unit was absorbed by the 5th Reserve Battalion, CEF, later that month.  The 253rd (University Highland) Battalion, CEF, had one officer commanding: Lieutenant-Colonel P. G. C. Campbell.

In 1920 the perpetuation of the 253rd Battalion was assigned to the Kingston Regiment (Princess of Wales' Own), which became the Princess of Wales' Own Regiment in 1936.

References

Meek, John F. Over the Top! The Canadian Infantry in the First World War. Orangeville, Ont.: The Author, 1971.

Battalions of the Canadian Expeditionary Force